Rodney Jarvis "Rod" Sherman (born December 25, 1944) is a former American football wide receiver who played professionally in the American Football League (AFL) and the National Football League (NFL).

High school career
Sherman attended John Muir High School in Pasadena, California.

College career
Sherman played college football at the University of Southern California.  He was All-Pac-8 in 1966.

Professional career
Sherman played for the AFL's Oakland Raiders (1967, 1969) and Cincinnati Bengals (1968) and for the NFL's Raiders (1970–1971), Denver Broncos (1972) and Los Angeles Rams (1973).

See also
 Other American Football League players

References

1944 births
Living people
Players of American football from Pasadena, California
American football wide receivers
John Muir High School alumni
USC Trojans football players
Cincinnati Bengals players
Oakland Raiders players
Denver Broncos players
Los Angeles Rams players
American Football League players